Bohuňovice is a municipality and village in Olomouc District in the Olomouc Region of the Czech Republic. It has about 2,500 inhabitants.

History
The first written mention of Bohuňovice is from 1078, when it was property of the newly established Hradisko Monastery. Bohuňovice was owned by the monastery until its abolishment in 1784.

References

Villages in Olomouc District